The Radio Marriage (German:Die Radio Heirat) is a 1924 German silent film directed by Wilhelm Prager and starring Maria Bard, Eduard von Winterstein and Hermann Thimig.

Cast
In alphabetical order

References

Bibliography
 Hans-Michael Bock and Tim Bergfelder. The Concise Cinegraph: An Encyclopedia of German Cinema. Berghahn Books.

External links

1924 films
Films of the Weimar Republic
German silent feature films
UFA GmbH films
German black-and-white films